This is a list of all NFL players who had outstanding performances throughout the 1940s and have been compiled together into this fantasy group. The team was selected by voters of the Pro Football Hall of Fame retroactively in 1969 to mark the league's 50th anniversary.

Notes:
 Team belonged to both the National Football Conference and the All-America Football Conference at different times 
 The Philadelphia Eagles and Pittsburgh Steelers were merged into one team for the 1943 season due to World War II
 Four-time finalist to be inducted into the Pro Football Hall of Fame

References 

National Football League All-Decade Teams
National Football League records and achievements
1940s in sports
Foot
Foot
National Football League lists